Hawkshead and Claife is  a National Trust property  made up of much of the town of Hawkshead and surrounding Claife Woodlands in Cumbria, England. Overlooking Windermere itself is Claife Station, the ruins of a residence notable for the fact that each room was glazed in differing coloured glass to give the effect of viewing the landscape in the changing seasons.

Hawkshead is home to the Beatrix Potter Gallery, another National Trust property. The Trust also owns four miles of access along Windermere lakeshore.

External links 
Beatrix Potter Gallery at Hawkshead information at the National Trust
Claife Viewing Station, Overlooking Windermere information at the National Trust

National Trust properties in the Lake District
Tourist attractions in Cumbria